The first part of Pinoy Big Brother: 737 began on June 20, 2015 and ended on August 8, 2015, lasting 50 days. This was part of the tenth year season of Big Brother in the Philippines. It was hosted by Toni Gonzaga, Bianca Gonzales, Robi Domingo and Enchong Dee. The show aired on ABS-CBN. at 10:00 p.m. (PST) every Mondays to Sundays.

The first batch of housemates that entered on Day 1 were teen housemates. 11 teens entered the house. The median age of this batch was 15 years old. An eviction was held every week where one housemate was evicted, until the seventh week, where two housemates were evicted. One housemate opted for a voluntary exit. On Day 50, the four finalists of this batch exited the House. On Day 84, one housemate from this batch crossed over to another batch of housemates. On Day 99, during It's Showtime, the four finalists were instructed to return to the House. On Day 133, after Zeus Collins was evicted, voting for the winner of this batch opened. On Day 141, Franco Rodriguez and Bailey May were named third and fourth placers, respectively. On the same day, voting for the remaining two housemates re-opened to determine the winner for this batch.

Jimboy Martin emerged as the winner for this batch.

Housemates

Before the launch, on June 15 to 19, the first seven teen housemates were introduced at different ABS-CBN programs, It's Showtime, TV Patrol, then had their first exclusive interview on Aquino & Abunda Tonight before formally introduced during the launch.  Four more housemates were introduced on Day 2 via ASAP 20 and directly enter the house after the introduction.

The ages indicated are the housemates' ages when they first entered the House. Origin indicates where the housemates were born or based before joining the program.

Houseguests
In its last two weeks, the show revealed that 3 in 737 means three celebrity houseguests. They will have their own missions inside the House. The first one is Enchong Dee, entered on Day 37, was tasked to be a toy robot to the housemates. Other houseguests were Georcelle Dapat of G-Force, Enrique Gil, Jolina Magdangal, Nyoy Volante impersonating Ariana Grande, Bea Alonzo, Richard Gomez, and Dawn Zulueta.

Chronology of events

Note that Day 1 started on June 20, 2015.

Week 1
On Day 1, Ryan, Kenzo, Jimboy, Bailey, Barbie and Kamille were the first teen housemates that had entered the house. Right after, they were given a task to determine the lock combinations of the confession room in order for them to meet the 7th teen housemate, Ailah; though they failed to completely get the exact combinations, they were able to open the door locks thus freeing Ailah from the said room. On Day 2, the second batch of housemates were introduced via ASAP 20. Enchong Dee was also introduced as a new host; and as one of the show's traditions with its hosts, Enchong had to stay inside the house. On the same day, Enchong was tasked to deliver a box, filled with things from the housemates' parents, without being noticed by them; he was successful. Afterwards, the housemates were called for an activity in the pool area, where they had to transfer 11 boxes using a big plane and ropes without getting wet; they were able to transfer 10 boxes. On that night, Bailey was called to the confession room for several violations. Right afterwards, all the remaining boys along with Barbie were called to the confession room for not wearing their lapel microphones. On Day 3, Bailey was punished to become a human speaker box and to remain as is until Big Brother had told him otherwise. On Day 4, the housemates were given their weekly task wherein they had to create a group performance showing their individual talents within 7 minutes and 37 seconds.

On Day 7, the housemates performed their weekly task; they were not successful after three tries. On the evening of Day 8, the nominees were revealed in the nomination night. The first nominees were Barbie, Kamille and Bailey; however, Kamille was removed from the list of nominees after winning the Ligtask Challenge.

Week 2
On Day 10, the housemates were given their second weekly task wherein they were required to form a design that makes the numbers 737 visible out of popsicle stick pops. Zonia is the leader of the task. On Day 14, Barbie was evicted from the house after garnering the fewest votes against Bailey.

Week 3
On Day Day 15, the second set of nominees were revealed. The second nominees were Ailah, Bailey, Ryan, Ylona and Zonia. The nominees were given a chance to save themselves in the "Ligtask" Challenge; however, no one win the challenge, therefore all of the nominees were still up for eviction. On Day 20,  they performed their weekly task "OKA YONIP" were in they performed the reversed play of the song "Pinoy Ako". They were successful. On Day 21, Ailah was evicted from the house after garnering the fewest votes against Bailey, Ryan, Ylona and Zonia.

Week 4
On Day 22, the housemates had their "Positive Nomination" wherein they need to choose which housemate is deserving to stay in the house. Franco, Jimboy, Kenzo and Kyle were the top 4 highest pointers and they are saved in the possible eviction. Bailey, Kamille, Ryan, Ylona and Zonia were up for eviction; however, Bailey was saved in the "Ligtask" Challenge and leaving Kamille, Ryan, Ylona and Zonia as the nominees for the week. On Day 28, Ryan was evicted from the house after garnering the fewest votes against Kamille, Ylona and Zonia.

Week 5
On Day 30, the housemates were given their fifth weekly task. They were grouped into two groups: the "Dream Team" composed of Kyle, Ylona, Bailey and Franco, and the "Pinoy Big Brothers & Sisters" composed of Jimboy, Kenzo, Kamille and Zonia. All of them were required to make 7 production numbers. Each of the 7 numbers must trend on Twitter for them to win the task; however, each group must still outperform one another in order wherein the winning group will win immunity for the next week's nomination. On Day 33, Kyle decided to make a voluntary exit despite winning the Ligtask challenge. On several days during the week, Nyoy Volante (while impersonating as Ariana Grande), Enrique Gil and Jolina Magdangal entered the house to mentor the housemates for their upcoming concert.

On Day 35, the two groups performed their 7 numbers for their Big-Ating Concert. The concert was attended by several ex-housemates from the franchise's three editions. After the housemates had performed their concert, Kyle had revealed to the other housemates that he had decided to make a voluntary exit. Kyle left the house on Day 36. On the same day, the result of the challenge for the two groups were revealed. It was announced that the "Dream Team" won the challenge, thus they are immune from the nominations for next week. The team also received a hundred thousand pesos which they will give to their chosen charity, the Bantay Bata 163. On the other hand, the members of "Pinoy Big Brothers & Sisters" were automatically nominated. After the announcements of the nominees, the Ligtask challenge followed. The said challenge was won by Kenzo.

Week 6
On Day 37, Enchong Dee was revealed as the first celebrity houseguest of the season that will temporarily stay inside the house. He was first tasked to pretend as a human-size robot toy. On Day 39, the housemates were given their sixth weekly task. They must rally the volleyball 737 times without letting it fall in the water. However, Big Brother gave Jimboy, Kamille, Zonia, and Ylona a chance to decrease the number of rallies by flying on a flyboard. The number of seconds they stay in the flyboard will be decreased  to the 737 rallies needed to win the task. They earned 91 seconds overall, decreasing the required rallies to 646. Throughout the days, housemates were able to use the other apps on the Big Tablet (see table below). Bailey used the Ligtas app, saving him from the next nomination. On Day 42, Zonia was evicted from the house after garnering the fewest votes against Jimboy and Kamille. On Day 43, Big Brother revert to the normal nomination process, but he let the housemates listen to what their loved ones have to say on whom they should nominate. At the end of the process, Franco, Kenzo, Kamille, and Ylona were up for eviction, but Kenzo won the Ligtask challenge, leaving Franco, Kamille, and Ylona to face the public vote. It was announced that eviction will take place on Day 47.

Week 7
On Day 44, Big Brother instructed the housemates to sort their personal stuff and put it in the boxes: Akin (Mine) – these things will be kept by the housemates, Alay (Give) – these will be given to people in need, and Ayaw (Do Not Want) – these will be thrown away as of Big Brother's discretion. After packing, they were instructed to stay in the bedroom as the ninjas take away more furniture from the House. Big Brother gave them a challenge to live without basic necessities at hand. They have to fish these items, that were scattered on the garden area, from behind a barricade. The bedrooms became off limits as well. Come night time, Enchong was instructed to host a fake Big Night event. Bailey and Ylona were removed from the roster, making Franco, Jimboy, Kenzo, and Kamille as "finalists." Eventually, Franco was named the "winner"; Jimboy, Kamille, and Kenzo came in second, third, and fourth place, respectively. With this in mind, Bailey and Ylona were moved to the garden area, where they'll be living separately from the other housemates. On Day 45, both groups were given a buzzer. If the four "finalists" think they deserve to stay, they must press the buzzer; in turn, Bailey and Ylona will be "evicted". If Bailey and Ylona think they deserve to stay, they must press the buzzer; in turn, they must pick two from the "finalists" who should be "evicted", in place of them. Bailey and Ylona buzzed first, and they chose Kenzo and Kamille to be "evicted." On Day 47, Kamille was evicted from the house after garnering the fewest votes against Franco and Ylona. On Day 48, Bailey, together with a street child, celebrated his birthday with the housemates. On Day 49, four thrones were placed inside at the four finalists. In the eviction, Bailey, Franco, Jimboy, and Ylona became finalists. Kenzo was the last evictee of this batch, garnering -9.38% of the net votes. By Day 50, the finalists exit the House.

Tasks and challenges

Weekly tasks

7:37

The housemates had to finish a task within 7 minutes and 37 seconds.

Ligtask

Nominated housemates had to compete in challenges in order to save themselves from eviction. In case of ties, no one will be saved.

The Big Tablet
On week 6, the housemates were given a Big Tablet, which contains "apps" they can use. The Big Tablet is available for a week, and it has ten battery bars. One battery bar is deducted for every app they use. Below are the "apps", and their corresponding definitions. They can use these apps at any time, and they can use it multiple times. Their first app, Games, was given as a "free trial", therefore no battery bars were deducted.

Nomination history

In every nomination, each housemate has to nominate two people with the first receiving two points and the second with one point. Starting with the second nomination round, new rules are being set by Big Brother. The normal nomination process was used on the sixth nomination round. See notes below for details.

Legend

Notes

Save-Evict voting result
Below is the breakdown of votes that took place in the final eviction round, before naming the four finalists.

References

External links
 Pinoy Big Brother Official website
 Pinoy Big Brother on Facebook
 Pinoy Big Brother on Twitter

737